Shatki is the name of several inhabited localities (work settlements and villages) in Russia.

Urban localities
Shatki, Nizhny Novgorod Oblast, a work settlement in Shatkovsky District of Nizhny Novgorod Oblast

Rural localities
Shatki, Kirov Oblast, a village in Kurchumsky Rural Okrug of Sunsky District of Kirov Oblast